Aleksei Mikhailovich Uvarov (born 1 June 1981) is a Russian former professional footballer.

External links

1981 births
Living people
Russian footballers
Russian Premier League players
Ukrainian Premier League players
Russian expatriate footballers
Expatriate footballers in Germany
Expatriate footballers in Ukraine
FC Chornomorets Odesa players
MFC Mykolaiv players
FC Arsenal Kyiv players
FC Rubin Kazan players
FC Chernomorets Novorossiysk players
Association football midfielders